Giacomo Cotellessa (born 19 March 1987) is an Italian footballer and his nickname is "Ghego".

Biography

Genoa and loans
Born in Genoa, Liguria, Cotellessa started his professional career at Genoa C.F.C. Cotellessa was a member of Primavera team (the U20 reserve A) in 2004–05 season, along with his brother Filippo Cotellessa. Giacomo started the next season with Genoa under 20 team,in January 2006 Giacomo left for Serie C1 club Chieti. and played once for the first team.

He returned to Genoa in 2006–07 season for its Primavera team and he won the " torneo di Viareggio cup " in February 2007.

In 2007 G.Cotellessa left for Serie C2 club Valenzana, while his brother Filippo Cotellessa left for Bolzanetese Virtus. G.Cotellessa played 26 times and scored three times in the fourth division.

In June 2008 he was transferred to Lucchese along with Genoa and Valenzana team-mate Alessandro Di Maio. However, after the bankrupt of Lucchese, Cotellessa left for Sangiovannese in co-ownership deal for a peppercorn fee of €500. He played 20 times in the fourth division (now called Lega Pro Seconda Divisione). In June 2009 Genoa gave up the remain 50% registration rights to Sangiovannese, made Genoa registered a financial loss of €500 in 2009 financial year, as the revenue of the other half already booked in 2008 financial year.

In September 2009 he terminated his contract with the Tuscany side.

Serie D
After a season with Borgorosso Arenzano (2009–2010),  he returned to LP Seconda Divisione for Sanremese. (His brother Filippo was played for Arenzano from 2008 to 2010) Giacomo played 8 times in LP Seconda Divisione. In December, he terminated his contract again and left for Lavagnese, another Liguria but in Serie D. A month later he left for Chiavari Caperana, yet another fifth division club in the region. Giacomo went to Asti in the season 2011–2012 another fifth division club   .

International career
In the season 2003–2004 he received two calls-up from Italy under-17 team. 
In April 2005 he received another call-up from Italy under-18 team. 
In February 2009 he received a call-up from Italy Universiade team to prepare for the event, he entered in the final team but sickbay for an injury he could not participate in the event in Belgrado.

References

External links
 Football.it Profile 
 LaSerieD.com Profile 

Italian footballers
Genoa C.F.C. players
S.S. Chieti Calcio players
Valenzana Mado players
A.S.D. Sangiovannese 1927 players
S.S.D. Sanremese Calcio players
Association football midfielders
Footballers from Genoa
1987 births
Living people
Asti Calcio F.C. players